Absolute Power is the twelfth studio album by American metal band Pro-Pain. It was released on May 5, 2010, by AFM Records.

Track listing
 "Unrestrained" – 3:47
 "Destroy the Enemy" – 4:47
 "Stand My Ground" – 3:38
 "Road to Nowhere" – 4:43
 "AWOL" – 2:49
 "Hell on Earth" – 4:57
 "Divided We Stand" – 1:48
 "Gone Rogue (I Apologize)" – 4:45
 "Rise of the Antichrist" – 3:20
 "Hate Coalition" – 2:38

Personnel 
 Gary Meskil – bass, vocals
 Tom Klimchuck – lead, rhythm guitar
 Marshall Stephens – rhythm guitar
 Rick Halverson – drums

Critical reception
The NewReview gave the album a 4 out of 5 rating and stated: "Pro-Pain broke the chains shackling me to generic, current music by showing that older can definitely be superior."

References 

2010 albums
Pro-Pain albums